Lucumo, in Etruscan lauchme or lauchume, was a title of Etruscan rulers, equivalent to the Latin rex, or "king".  In Roman sources, it is frequently mistaken for a personal name, particularly in the case of Lucius Tarquinius Priscus, the fifth King of Rome, a native of Etruria who is said to have adopted a Roman name in place of his original name, Lucumo.  Heurgon compares this to the Etruscan use of the Roman magister, "magistrate", as a personal name in the case of Servius Tullius, the sixth Roman king, known in Etruscan as the hero "Macstarna".

Although much of what is known of the Etruscans from Roman literature refers to their kings, the various Etruscan city-states seem to have abolished their monarchies around the same period as the establishment of the Roman Republic.  The lucumones were replaced by magistrates bearing the title of zilath, evidently the Etruscan equivalent of magister.  In later times, Lauchme survived as an Etruscan surname.

The title of lucumo may have been bestowed on the priestly official elected to represent the twelve cities of the "Etruscan dodecapolis".  With the passage of time, this official was also replaced by an annually-elected magistrate.

References

Bibliography
 Dionysius of Halicarnassus, Romaike Archaiologia (Roman Antiquities).
 Titus Livius (Livy), History of Rome.
 Jacques Heurgon, La Vie quotidienne chez lez Etrusques (Daily Life of the Etruscans), Hachette, Paris (1961, 1989), James Kirkup, translator, Phoenix Press, London (2002).
 Anne Mueller von der Haegen and Ruth F. Strasser, "The Mysterious People of Etruria", in Art & Architecture: Tuscany, H.F. Ullmann, Potsdam,  (2013).

Etruscans